William A. Walaska (September 16, 1945 – April 3, 2017) was an American Democratic politician and a member of the Rhode Island Senate who represented District 30 from 2003 to 2017. Walaska served consecutively from January 1995 until January 2003 in the District 17 seat.

Education
Walaska attended Williams College and Dartmouth College, and earned his BA in economics and his MBA from Providence College.

Elections
2012 Walaska was unopposed for the September 11, 2012 Democratic Primary, winning with 882 votes, and won the three-way November 6, 2012 General election with 7,585 votes (61.0%) against Republican nominee Keith Burkitt and Independent candidate Arthur Groh.
1994 When District 17 incumbent Senator Thomas Lynch left the Legislature and left the seat open, Walaska won the September 13, 1994 Democratic Primary and won the November 8, 1994 General election with 4,424 votes (57.7%) against Republican nominee Steven Archer.
1996 Walaska and returning 1994 Republican opponent Steven Archer were both unopposed for their September 10, 1996 primaries, setting up a rematch; Walaska won the November 5, 1996 General election with 5,353 votes (68.9%) against Archer.
1998 Walaska was unopposed for the September 15, 1998 Democratic Primary, winning with 1,475 votes, and won the November 3, 1998 General election with 4,941 votes (73.4%) against Republican nominee Raymond McKay.
2000 Walaska was unopposed for both the September 12, 2000 Democratic Primary, winning with 1,704 votes, and the November 7, 2000 General election, winning with 6,373 votes.
2002 Redistricted to District 30, and with incumbent Democratic Senator Paul Kelly retiring and leaving the seat open, Walaska was unopposed for both the September 10, 2002 Democratic Primary, winning with 1,932 votes, and the November 5, 2002 General election, winning with 7,331 votes.
2004 Walaska was unopposed for the September 14, 2004 Democratic Primary, winning with 512 votes, and won the November 2, 2004 General election with 7,758 votes (69.5%) against Republican nominee Roland Denomme.
2006 Walaska was unopposed for both the September 12, 2006 Democratic Primary, winning with 1,483 votes, and the November 7, 2006 General election, winning with 8,916 votes.
2008 Walaska was unopposed for both the September 9, 2008 Democratic Primary, winning with 1,013 votes, and the November 4, 2008 General election, winning with 9,256 votes.
2010 Walaska was unopposed for the September 23, 2010 Democratic Primary, winning with 1,306 votes, and won the November 2, 2010 General election with 5,545 votes (57.3%) against Republican nominee Armand Lusi.
2016 Walaska was defeated by Jeanine Calkin in the September 13, 2016 Democratic Primary by a 75-vote margin, ending his 22-year career in the Rhode Island Senate

Death
Walaska died on April 3, 2017 of cancer.

References

External links

William Walaska at Ballotpedia
William A. Walaska at the National Institute on Money in State Politics

1946 births
2017 deaths
Dartmouth College alumni
Politicians from Providence, Rhode Island
Politicians from Warwick, Rhode Island
Providence College alumni
Democratic Party Rhode Island state senators
Williams College alumni
American politicians of Polish descent
21st-century American politicians
20th-century American politicians
Deaths from cancer